Galdino Teixeira de Barros Loreto was a Brazilian politician. He was interventor on the government of the state of Espírito Santo from December 8, 1891 to May 3, 1892 as part of a governing junta composed also of Inácio Henrique de Gouveia and Graciano dos Santos Neves.

References 

Governors of Espírito Santo
Year of birth missing
Year of death missing